The 2009 season was the Arizona Cardinals' 90th in the National Football League, their 22nd in Arizona and their third under head coach Ken Whisenhunt.

The Cardinals finished the season with a 10–6 record, an improvement from their 9–7 previous season record and the first time the team has won 10 games since 1976. The franchise was able to successfully defend the National Football Conference (NFC) West division title and earned a playoff berth in the NFC Wild Card round against the Green Bay Packers, which they won in overtime by 51–45, the highest scoring game for two teams combined in a playoff game. The following week on January 17, 2010, the Cardinals were blown out by the eventual Super Bowl champion New Orleans Saints in the NFC divisional round. This game would be the final game of quarterback Kurt Warner's career, and this was the only playoff game in thirteen total appearances in which he failed to throw a touchdown pass.

The 2009 season was the team's first to secure back-to-back postseason appearances since its move to Arizona, and the first time the team did so since 1975.

Offseason

Staff changes
 Billy Davis has replaced Clancy Pendergast as Defensive Coordinator.
 Russ Grimm has been appointed Running Game Coordinator and retains his title of Assistant Head Coach and Offensive Line Coach.
 Todd Haley has left the Offensive Coordinator position to join the Kansas City Chiefs as their Head coach.
 John McNulty has replaced Mike Miller as Receivers Coach.
 Chris Miller has been appointed Quarterbacks coach.
 Mike Miller has been promoted from Receivers Coach to Passing Game Coordinator.
 Curtis Modkins has replaced Maurice Carthon as Running Backs coach.
 Matt Raich has replaced Billy Davis as Linebackers coach.

Signings
C/G Ben Claxton
FB Justin Green
FB Dan Kreider
LS Mike Leach
S Keith Lewis
CB Bryant McFadden
QB Tyler Palko
P Waylon Prather
RB Jason Wright

Released
LS Nathan Hodel

Free agents

2009 NFL Draft

As NFC champion and having lost Super Bowl XLIII, the Cardinals had the second-to-last pick in the first round (31st overall).

Coaching staff

Final roster

Preseason

Schedule

Regular season

Schedule

Standings

Regular season results

Week 1: vs. San Francisco 49ers

With their NFC title on the line, the Cardinals began their season at home in a Week 1 divisional duel with their NFC West rival, the San Francisco 49ers.  In the first quarter, Arizona trailed early as Niners kicker Joe Nedney got a 37-yard and a 50-yard field goal.  In the second quarter, the Cardinals got on the board as kicker Neil Rackers made a 44-yard field goal.  San Francisco answered with running back Frank Gore getting a 6-yard touchdown run, while Arizona closed out the half with Rackers kicking a 29-yard field goal.

The Cardinals would tie the game in the third quarter as quarterback Kurt Warner completed a 5-yard touchdown pass to wide receiver Larry Fitzgerald.  In the fourth quarter, Arizona took the lead as Rackers nailed a 43-yard field goal.  However, the 49ers regained their lead as quarterback Shaun Hill completed a 3-yard touchdown pass to Gore.  San Francisco's defense would then prevent the Cards' offense from rallying.

With the loss, the Cardinals began their season at 0–1.

Week 2: at Jacksonville Jaguars

Hoping to rebound from their loss to the 49ers, the Cardinals traveled to Jacksonville Municipal Stadium for a Week 2 interconference duel with the Jacksonville Jaguars. The Cardinals scored on their first drive with a 1-yard run by running back Tim Hightower. The Jaguars also scored on their first possession with a 30-yard field goal from kicker Josh Scobee. Arizona then answered with a 45-yard field goal by kicker Neil Rackers. In the second quarter, trailing 10–3, the Jaguars lined up for another Scobee field goal only to have it blocked by backup defensive end Calais Campbell and returned by free safety Antrel Rolle for an 83-yard touchdown. The Cardinals would extend their lead by halftime as quarterback Kurt Warner completed a 5-yard touchdown pass to running back Jason Wright.

Warner would find wide receiver Larry Fitzgerald in the third quarter for a 22-yard touchdown pass that increased the Cardinal lead to 28. Jacksonville would attempt to mount a comeback with quarterback David Garrard completing a 25-yard touchdown pass to tight end Marcedes Lewis in the third quarter and a 25-yard touchdown pass to wide receiver Mike Sims-Walker in the fourth quarter, but Arizona held on for the victory.

With the win, the Cardinals improved to 1–1.

Warner's performance (24/26, 243 yards, 2 TDs) would become the new NFL record for a single-game completion percentage (92.3%), snapping Vinny Testaverde's old record set in 1993 (91.3%).

Week 3: vs. Indianapolis Colts

Coming off their Week 2 road win over the Jaguars, the Cardinals went home for a Week 3 Sunday night interconference duel with the Indianapolis Colts.  Arizona took flight in the first quarter with kicker Neil Rackers' 38-yard field goal.  However, the Colts took a monster lead in the second quarter as quarterback Peyton Manning completed a 20-yard touchdown pass to wide receiver Reggie Wayne, a 10-yard touchdown pass to tight end Dallas Clark, and a 53-yard touchdown pass to wide receiver Pierre Garçon.

The Cardinals tried to fight back in the third quarter as quarterback Kurt Warner hooked up with wide receiver Anquan Boldin on a 10-yard touchdown pass, but Indianapolis replied with Manning's 3-yard touchdown pass to running back Joseph Addai.  Afterwards, the Colts closed out the game in the fourth quarter with kicker Adam Vinatieri's 26-yard field goal.

With the loss, Arizona entered its bye week at 1–2.

Week 4: BYE

Week 5: vs. Houston Texans

Coming off their bye week, the Cardinals stayed at home for a Week 5 interconference duel with the Houston Texans.  Arizona would get off to a very fast start as running back Tim Hightower got a 1-yard touchdown run in the first quarter, followed by quarterback Kurt Warner completing a 9-yard and a 26-yard touchdown pass to wide receiver Larry Fitzgerald in the second.

However, the Texans gained steam in the third quarter with a 1-yard touchdown run from running back Chris Brown.  Afterwards, Houston would tie the game in the fourth quarter with quarterback Matt Schaub completing an 11-yard and a 17-yard touchdown pass to wide receiver Andre Johnson.  However, the Cardinals went back to work with two crucial defensive moments.  First, cornerback Dominique Rodgers-Cromartie would return an interception 49 yards for a touchdown.  Second, even when the Texans' offense got down to Arizona's 1-yard line on a 1st down play inside of the two-minute warning, the defense withstood three tries and held on for the victory.

With the win, the Cardinals improved to 2–2.

Week 6: at Seattle Seahawks

Coming off their home win over the Texans, the Cardinals flew to Qwest Field for a Week 6 NFC West duel with the Seattle Seahawks.  Arizona took flight in the first quarter with quarterback Kurt Warner hooking up with wide receiver Larry Fitzgerald on a 2-yard touchdown pass, followed by a 2-yard touchdown run from running back Tim Hightower.  In the second quarter, the Cardinals would add onto their lead as kicker Neil Rackers made a 29-yard field goal.  The Seahawks would then get their only score of the game as kicker Olindo Mare got a 28-yard field goal.  In the second half, Arizona pulled away with Warner completing a 16-yard touchdown pass to wide receiver Steve Breaston in the third quarter and Rackers booting a 31-yard field goal in the fourth.

With the win, the Cardinals improved to 3–2.

Week 7: at New York Giants

Coming off their road win over the Seahawks, the Cardinals flew to Giants Stadium for a Week 7 Sunday night duel with the New York Giants.  After a scoreless first quarter, Arizona would trail in the second quarter as Giants running back Brandon Jacobs got a 4-yard touchdown run.  The Cardinals would answer with rookie running back Chris "Beanie" Wells, but New York came right back with quarterback Eli Manning completing a 62-yard touchdown pass to wide receiver Hakeem Nicks.  Arizona would end the half with kicker Neil Rackers nailing a 30-yard field goal.

The Cardinals would take the lead in the third quarter with running back Tim Hightower's 1-yard touchdown run, followed by quarterback Kurt Warner completing a 6-yard touchdown pass to running back Jason Wright.  The Giants tried to come back in the fourth quarter as kicker Lawrence Tynes booted a 20-yard field goal, yet safety Antrel Rolle's final interception of the game sealed the deal for Arizona.

With the win, the Cardinals improved to 4–2.

Week 8: vs. Carolina Panthers

Coming off their impressive road win over the Giants, the Cardinals went home for a Week 8 duel with the Carolina Panthers in a rematch of last year's divisional game.

In the first quarter, Arizona trailed early as Panthers running back Jonathan Stewart got a 6-yard touchdown run.  The Cardinals would respond as quarterback Kurt Warner completed a 14-yard touchdown pass to rookie running back LaRod Stephens-Howling.  However, Carolina unleashed its fury in the second quarter with Stewart's 10-yard touchdown run, quarterback Jake Delhomme's 50-yard touchdown pass to wide receiver Steve Smith, and defensive end Julius Peppers returning an interception 13 yards for a touchdown.

The Cardinals would begin their rally in the third quarter as Warner connected with tight end Ben Patrick on a 1-yard touchdown pass, but the Panthers would answer in the fourth quarter as kicker John Kasay booted a 35-yard field goal.  Arizona tried to come back as running back Tim Hightower got a 1-yard touchdown run, but Carolina would seal the win as Kasay nailed a 31-yard field goal.

With the loss, the Cardinals fell to 4–3.

Week 9: at Chicago Bears

Hoping to rebound from their home loss to the Panthers, the Cardinals flew to Soldier Field for a Week 9 duel with the Chicago Bears.  Arizona would deliver the opening strike in the first quarter as quarterback Kurt Warner completed an 11-yard touchdown pass to wide receiver Larry Fitzgerald.  The Bears would respond with quarterback Jay Cutler hooking up with tight end Greg Olsen on a 33-yard touchdown pass, yet the Cardinals would answer with Warner finding tight end Ben Patrick on a 6-yard touchdown pass.  In the second quarter, Arizona would unleash a firestorm as Warner found Fitzgerald again on a 17-yard touchdown pass, followed by tight end Anthony Becht on a 15-yard touchdown pass.  Afterwards, the Cardinals would close out the half with a 43-yard field goal by kicker Neil Rackers.

In the third quarter, Arizona would get the period's only points as Rackers booted a 30-yard field goal.  Chicago would begin to rally in the fourth quarter as Cutler found Olsen again on a 3-yard and a 20-yard touchdown, yet the Cards closed out the game with Warner hooking up with wide receiver Steve Breaston on a 4-yard touchdown pass.

With the win, the Cardinals improved to 5–3.

Week 10: vs. Seattle Seahawks

Coming off their dominating road win over the Bears, the Cardinals went home for a Week 10 NFC West rematch with the Seattle Seahawks.  Arizona would trail in the first quarter as Seahawks running back Justin Forsett got a 20-yard touchdown run.  In the second quarter, Seattle would increase their lead as quarterback Matt Hasselbeck found tight end John Carlson on a 31-yard touchdown pass.  The Cardinals would get on the board with quarterback Kurt Warner's 28-yard touchdown pass to wide receiver Steve Breaston, but the Seahawks answered with kicker Olindo Mare getting a 32-yad field goal.  Arizona would end the half with a 27-yard field goal from kicker Neil Rackers.

The Cardinals would tie the game in the third quarter with a 10-yard touchdown run from rookie running back Chris "Beanie" Wells.  Seattle tried to take control in the fourth quarter with Mare booting a 20-yard field goal, yet Arizona came out on top as Wells picked up a 13-yard touchdown run and Warner connected with wide receiver Larry Fitzgerald on an 18-yard touchdown pass.

With the win, the Cardinals improved to 6–3.

Week 11: at St. Louis Rams

Looking to improve to 5–0 on the road, the Cardinals went to their former home for a Week 11 duel against divisional rival St. Louis Rams. The Rams would score first, on a Josh Brown field goal following a fumble by Chris "Beanie" Wells.  However, the Cardinals would score the next 21 points, as Kurt Warner connected with Anquan Boldin for a touchdown at the end of the first quarter, followed by a Warner to Larry Fitzgerald touchdown and a Beanie Wells rushing touchdown in the second quarter.

During the second touchdown drive of the second quarter, Warner was hit hard by St. Louis safety O.J. Atogwe, with his head hitting the turf as he went down.  Warner played the remaining six plays of the drive, but was replaced for the remainder of the game by backup quarterback Matt Leinart.  Leinart struggled with a more conservative game throughout the second half, and the Cardinals did not score for the remainder of the game.  St. Louis attempted to rally; however, they were only able to muster a second Josh Brown field goal and a Steven Jackson touchdown.

With the win, the Cardinals improved to 7–3; however, Warner's status remained questionable for the next week's game against the Tennessee Titans.

Week 12: at Tennessee Titans

With Kurt Warner on the sidelines due to injury, and in the tenth season since he won Super Bowl XXXIV over the Titans, the Cardinals fell to a game-winning rally led by quarterback Vince Young as he raced the Titans 99 yards down field over the final 2:37, converted two fourth downs, and fired the winning ten-yard touchdown on the final play to Kenny Britt.  The win made the Titans the first team to win five straight after starting 0–6 as they improved to 5–6 while the Cardinals fell to 7–4.

Week 13: vs. Minnesota Vikings

Week 13 saw the return of star quarterback Kurt Warner to the line-up. The Cardinals took off in the first half building a 24–10 lead. Warner played exceptionally well, throwing for three first half touchdowns on his way to a 285-yard effort. The defense stifled Favre and the Vikings and held Adrian Peterson to a season-low 19 yards. The Warner led offense propelled the Cards to a stunningly one-sided 30–17 victory.

With the win, the Cardinals improved to 8–4.

Week 14: at San Francisco 49ers

Week 15: at Detroit Lions

Week 16: vs. St. Louis Rams

With this win, The Cardinals got their 10th win of the season. The last time the Cardinals had double digit wins in a season was in 1976.

Week 17: vs. Green Bay Packers

With the Vikings win earlier in the day, this game was rendered unimportant. The Cardinals pulled Kurt Warner along with other starters early in the 2nd quarter while the Packers continued to play their starters until the 4th quarter. Late in the 4th quarter, quarterback Brian St. Pierre threw his first career touchdown pass.

Post season results

Schedule

NFC Wild Card: vs. Green Bay Packers

Entering the postseason as the NFC's #4 seed, the Cardinals began their playoff run at home in the NFC Wild Card game against the #5 Green Bay Packers, looking to avenge their Week 17 defeat.

Arizona would take advantage of some Packer turnovers early in the first quarter by turning them into a 1-yard touchdown run for running back Tim Hightower and quarterback Kurt Warner's 15-yard touchdown pass to wide receiver Early Doucet.  The Cardinals would also add a 23-yard field goal from kicker Neil Rackers.  Green Bay would reply in the second quarter with quarterback Aaron Rodgers getting a 1-yard touchdown run, yet Arizona went right back to work as Warner found Doucet again on a 15-yard touchdown pass.  The Packers would end the half with a 20-yard field goal from kicker Mason Crosby.

In the third quarter, the Cardinals went back to work as Warner found wide receiver Larry Fitzgerald on a 33-yard touchdown pass, but Green Bay would answer with Rodgers completing a 6-yard touchdown pass to wide receiver Greg Jennings followed by a 10-yard touchdown pass to wide receiver Jordy Nelson.  Arizona continued to show off its offense firepower as Warner hooked up with Fitzgerald again on an 11-yard touchdown pass.  The Packers would tie the game in the fourth quarter as Rodgers would complete a 30-yard touchdown pass to wide receiver James Jones, followed by fullback John Kuhn's 1-yard touchdown run.  The Cardinals' offense continued to flex its muscles as Warner found wide receiver Steve Breaston on a 17-yard touchdown pass.  Just then, Green Bay would tie the game again as Rodgers would complete an 11-yard touchdown pass to tight end Spencer Havner.  The Cardinals drove down field in the final minutes, but a 34-yard field goal try by Neil Rackers with nine seconds remaining sailed wide left, forcing overtime.

Arizona's defense would rise to the occasion in overtime as linebacker Karlos Dansby recovered a fumble and ran it back 17 yards for the game-winning touchdown.

With the win, the Cardinals improved to overall record to 11–6.

The 96 combined points between both teams would become the highest point total in an NFL postseason game.

NFC Divisional Round: at New Orleans Saints

Coming off their shootout win over the Packers, the Cardinals flew to the Louisiana Superdome for the NFC Divisional Round against the top-seeded New Orleans Saints.  On their very first offensive play of the game, Arizona came out fast as running back Tim Hightower got a 70-yard touchdown run.  The Saints would hugely respond with running back Lynell Hamilton getting a 1-yard touchdown run, followed by quarterback Drew Brees completing a 17-yard touchdown pass to tight end Jeremy Shockey, along with running back Reggie Bush getting a 54-yard touchdown run.  In the second quarter, the Cardinals would come right back as rookie running back Chris "Beanie" Wells got a 4-yard touchdown run.  However, New Orleans came right back as Brees threw a 44-yard touchdown pass to wide receiver Devery Henderson and a 2-yard touchdown pass to wide receiver Marques Colston.

The Saints would add onto their lead in the third quarter with a 43-yard field goal from kicker Garrett Hartley, followed by an 83-yard punt return for a touchdown by Bush.  Arizona tried to rally, but New Orleans' defense continued to shut down any possible comeback, effectively sealing a Cardinals blowout.

With the loss, the Cardinals' season ended with an overall record of 11–7.

References

External links
2009 Arizona Cardinals season at Pro Football Reference
2009 Arizona Cardinals season at ESPN

Arizona
Arizona Cardinals seasons
NFC West championship seasons
Arizona